Eftimiu is a Romanian surname and may refer to: 

Constantin Eftimiu (1893–1950), Romanian general during World War II
Victor Eftimiu (1889–1972), Romanian poet and playwright

Romanian-language surnames